Guyana National Museum is a museum in Georgetown, Demerara-Mahaica, Guyana. It was established on 13 February 1868. 
The idea of starting a museum was conceived by members of the Royal Agricultural and Commercial Society (RACS) of British Guiana. When RACS was established in 1844,
one of its aims was to construct a Museum to house local minerals, soils, timbers, fruits, seeds, gums, resins, dyes and drugs, as well as the flora and fauna of the country.
British explorer Robert Schomburgk, the German botanist Carl Ferdinand Appun, Mr Bratt, and W.H. Campbell presented gifts (including 55 indigenous woods, minerals from England, and specimens of botany and geology) to the RACS in order to start a Museum Collection. A fire in 1864 destroyed the donated collections.

A British Guiana Museum Company was established in 1867 for the construction of a building "which should be the permanent home of science, art, and industry." This project received great financial support from the public and the new museum on Company Path was opened on 13 February 1868. The Colonist newspaper of that date described it as a "magnificent structure."

The museum's first curator was Dr. H Witlock, the Medical Officer of Health. He was succeeded by Mr. Fresson. Everard im Thurn was later appointed by the government in 1877. He was a qualified curator who traveled to the interior in search of specimens of ethnology and other exhibits for the Museum. When the RACS launched the Timehri Journal, Mr im Thurn served as its editor. Other curators who made noteworthy contributions were John Joseph Quelch, James Rodway and Dr Walter Roth.

In 1934, the Georgetown Public Free Library received a second story, made possible through grants from the Carnegie Corporation, which was used to house the Museum collections.

The government assumed responsibility for the RACS Museum in 1936, renaming it the British Guiana Museum. It was administered by the Georgetown Public Free Library Committee. Mr P Storer Peberdy became the new curator in that year. During his administration, the Economic, Anthropological and Historical Section was opened in the upper flat of the Public Free Library on 19 February 1937. The Director of Education and the Curator arranged for public lectures to be given in the Museum. Mr. Peberdy traveled into the interior and obtained material which was added to the British Guiana Museum collection. He was succeeded by Vincent Roth in 1943.

On 23 February 1945, a fire that started at the Bookers Drug Store, opposite the British Guiana Museum, spread to the Natural History Section of the Museum and the RACS Reading Rooms and Library. The Public Free Library was not affected by the fire, sparing the ethnological collection. After the fire, Lot 53 Main Street was used as a taxidermy laboratory for the reconstruction of natural history exhibits.

Then governor, Sir Gordon Lethem, met with government officials on 16 March 1945 to propose the construction of a cultural centre on the site of the destroyed British Guiana Museum. The building would house the RACS Reading Rooms, the British Guiana Museum and an auditorium for dramatic presentations. It was recommended that a request be made for funding from the Colonial Development and Welfare Commission. Subsequently, the RACS began construction of the new Library and Reading Rooms.

The colonial government voted sums of money for the education of Ram Singh, the museum's taxidermist. In 1946, Mr Singh travelled to the United States to study taxidermy, botany, anthropology and zoology. He returned to British Guiana in 1947. Before his departure, the taxidermy laboratory was removed from Main Street to the former Cummingsburg market (1946). During the following years a temporary National History Museum was established and opened in 1949.

As use of the Public Free Library expanded, new space for the museum was considered. In July 1950, the RACS assumed control of the British Guiana Museum from the Public Free Library. The new museum building at North Road and Hincks Street was reopened on 28 July 1951 by the Officer Administering the Government, John Gutch.

Artifacts 
Many of the museum's artifacts have been there for more than fifty years, like the Pork-knocker, which has been on display for over sixty years. There are also miniature versions of the Transport and Harbours Department Ferry boats. On display is also the PR1 vehicle, used by the Prime Minister Dr. Ptolemy Reid, during his tenure in high political office.

References

Museums in Guyana
Buildings and structures in Georgetown, Guyana
Natural history of Guyana
Guyana
Museums established in 1868
1868 establishments in South America